Bashar Lulua بشار لؤلؤة is a Cambridge-based freelance orchestra conductor of Arab heritage. He is the founding conductor & manager of the Ur Performing Arts ensemble.

Early life 
Lulua was born in Damascus, Syria on 19 September 1963 to an Iraqi father and a Palestinian mother who had met in Cleveland, Ohio, while working on their graduate degrees in English literature.

He received his initial musical education at the Baghdad Conservatoire (or the Model School of Music & Ballet, 1970–71; 1972–81), where he was classically trained by Soviet, Hungarian, and Arab music teachers, and spent some of his formative years in Kuwait City (1967–70), and Cambridge, England (1971–72), where he began to learn English at the Church of England Grantchester Primary School. He pursued his musical studies in Vienna and Salzburg (1981–85), Kent, Ohio (1985–88), Austin, Texas (1988–93), as well as San Francisco, and Los Angeles, California (1994–96 and 1998–2000, respectively).

Career 
Having studied conducting privately with Peter Richter de Rangenier at the Vienna Music University, with Frank Wiley at Kent State University, Kent, Ohio, and with Louis Lane at The University of Texas at Austin, Lulua received further practical training from the San Francisco Symphony and the Los Angeles Philharmonic Orchestra, Herbert Blomstedt and Esa-Pekka Salonen, music directors, respectively.
 
Lulua has conducted performances in the Middle East, Europe and the United States since 1978, and founded several orchestras, such as The 'Ur Orchestra in Austin, Texas and Philharmonia Scotland in Glasgow.

Lulua was invited by the renowned London-based American composer Stephen Montague to contribute to the BBC Symphony Orchestra-sponsored "John Cage UnCaged Musicircus" at the Barbican Centre, London in 2004.

While in Berlin 2008–2009, Bashar co-translated the best-selling historical German novel Die Karawanenkönigin by Tessa Korber into Arabic. This was published in Berlin in 2009.

In a 2009 masterclass guided by Maestro Jorma Panula with the Rousse Philharmonic Orchestra in Bulgaria, Bashar conducted the first movement of the Resurrection Symphony by Gustav Mahler. He returned to Bulgaria in 2013 to conduct Act 3 of La bohème at the Burgas State Opera.

Lulua was the Principal Guest Conductor of the Camerata Miskolc in Miskolc, Hungary, with whom he recorded in May 2011 rarely performed works, such as Antonín Dvořák's Notturno in B, op. 40, Carl Nielsen's Little Suite for strings, op. 1, and Jean Sibelius' Romance in C, op. 42, Impromptu, and Rakastava (The Lover), op. 14.

Personal life 
He is a naturalised citizen of the United Kingdom.

References

External links 
Official Site
Official Site
Official Facebook

1963 births
Living people
English people of Iraqi descent
English people of Palestinian descent
Iraqi conductors (music)
Syrian people of Iraqi descent
Syrian people of Palestinian descent
Syrian emigrants to the United Kingdom
People from Damascus
21st-century conductors (music)